Philippe Jacques William Montanier (born 15 November 1964) is French professional football manager and former player who is the head coach of  club Toulouse. As a player, he was as a goalkeeper.

Early life
Philippe Jacques William Montanier was born on 15 November 1964 in Vernon, Eure.

Managerial career
Montanier was head coach of Boulogne from 2004 and was named Ligue 2 Manager of the Year in 2009. After achieving promotion to Ligue 1, he left Boulogne for Valenciennes on 3 June 2009.

He was offered the job as La Liga club Real Sociedad manager, signing a two-year contract with the club on 4 June 2011.

On 21 May 2013, it was announced that Montanier would not extend his contract at Real Sociedad, and instead, he later joined Rennes at the end of the season.

On 27 June 2016, Montanier was appointed manager of EFL Championship side Nottingham Forest. His first game in charge was on 6 August, where his side beat newly-promoted Burton Albion 4–3 at the City Ground. On 14 January 2017, Montanier was relieved of his duties following a run of two points from a possible 21 and only two clean sheets in 30 games.

On 2 November 2017, Montanier became the new head coach of the France under-20 team.

On 22 May 2018, Montanier took over as Lens manager.

Managerial statistics

Honours

Manager
Boulogne
Championnat National 2: 2004–05

Rennes
Coupe de France runner-up: 2013–14

Toulouse
Ligue 2: 2021–22

Individual
Ligue 2 Manager of the Year: 2008–09, 2021–22

References

External links

1964 births
Living people
People from Vernon, Eure
Sportspeople from Eure
Footballers from Normandy
French footballers
Association football goalkeepers
Ligue 1 players
Ligue 2 players
Stade Malherbe Caen players
FC Nantes players
Toulouse FC players
FC Gueugnon players
AS Saint-Étienne players
French football managers
Ligue 1 managers
Ligue 2 managers
US Boulogne managers
Valenciennes FC managers
La Liga managers
Real Sociedad managers
Stade Rennais F.C. managers
Nottingham Forest F.C. managers
RC Lens managers
Standard Liège managers
Toulouse FC managers
French expatriate football managers
Expatriate football managers in Spain
French expatriate sportspeople in Spain
Expatriate football managers in England
French expatriate sportspeople in England
Expatriate football managers in Belgium
French expatriate sportspeople in Belgium